__notoc__
David Addison Haig (born 28 June 1958) is an Australian evolutionary biologist, geneticist, and professor in Harvard University's Department of Organismic and Evolutionary Biology. He is interested in intragenomic conflict, genomic imprinting and parent–offspring conflict, and wrote the book Genomic Imprinting and Kinship. His major contribution to the field of evolutionary theory is the kinship theory of genomic imprinting.

Significant papers 
 Haig, D. (1993). Genetic conflicts in human pregnancy. Quarterly Review of Biology, 68, 495-532.
 Haig, D. (1997) The social gene. In Krebs, J. R. & Davies, N. B. (editors) Behavioural Ecology: an Evolutionary Approach, pp. 284-304. Blackwell Publishers, London.
 Haig, D. (2000) The kinship theory of genomic imprinting. Annual Review of Ecology and Systematics, 31, 9-32.
 Wilkins, J. F. & Haig, D. (2003) What good is genomic imprinting: the function of parent-specific gene expression. Nature Reviews Genetics, 4, 359-368. 
 Haig, D. (2004) Genomic imprinting and kinship: how good is the evidence? Annual Review of Genetics, 38, 553-585.

Books 
 Haig, D. (2002) Genomic Imprinting and Kinship. Rutgers University Press, Piscataway, NJ. 
 Haig, D. (2020) From Darwin to Derrida: Selfish Genes, Social Selves, and the Meanings of Life. MIT Press, Cambridge, MA.

References

External links 
 Official site at Harvard University
 Harvard Gazette news about David Haig

1958 births
Living people
Evolutionary biologists
Harvard University faculty